is a Japanese professional wrestler and idol, currently signed to the Japanese professional wrestling promotion World Wonder Ring Stardom, where she is the leader of Club Venus, a sub-group of Cosmic Angels. She is a former Artist of Stardom and Future of Stardom Champion.

Professional wrestling career

Independent circuit (2018–2020)

Shirakawa made her professional wrestling debut at BBJ Muscle Ring on August 5, 2018, the first-ever event of the Best Body Japan Pro-Wrestling promotion, where she teamed up with Shoko Nakajima in a losing effort against Reika Saiki and Hoshimi Muramatsu.<ref>{{Cite web|url=http://battle-news.com/?p=41871|title="Glamorous strong style" Mina Shirakawa makes her professional wrestling debut against "muscular idol" Reika Saiki! "Pro-wrestling is painful!"|work=battle-news.com|author=Best Body Japan|language=Japanese|date=August 5, 2018|access-date=March 14, 2021}}</ref> She wrestled at several other events of the promotion such as the BBJ Muscle Ring 2 from October 18, 2018, where she lost against Cherry, and BBJ Muscle Ring 3 from December 26, 2018 where she lost to Misaki Ohata. She worked a match for DDT Pro-Wrestling, at Ryōgoku Peter Pan 2018 from October 21, where she teamed up with Miyu Yamashita and Yuki Kamifuku and lost to Yuka Sakazaki, Mizuki and Shoko Nakajima in a six-woman tag team match. Shirakawa worked most of her matches for Tokyo Joshi Pro Wrestling, the first one occurring on the second night of TJP 5th Anniversary Shin-Kiba Tour from November 4, 2018, where she teamed up with Reika Saiki in a losing effort against Maki Itoh and Shoko Nakajima. CMLL and Lady's Ring held their second joint show, Numero Dos, where the main event saw CMLL representative Dalys la Caribeña defeat Lady's Ring representative Mina Shirakawa in a best two-out-of-three falls match to win the reactivated CMLL Japan Women's Championship on Jan 22, 2020.

World Wonder Ring Stardom (2020–present)
Shirakawa currently works for World Wonder Ring Stardom. Her first match in the promotion was at Stardom Yokohama Cinderella from October 3, 2020, where she won against Hanan. Shirakawa would later team up with Tam Nakano and Unagi Sayaka to form the Cosmic Angels trio with whom she won the Artist of Stardom Championship at Stardom Road To Osaka Dream Cinderella on December 16, 2020, by defeating Oedo Tai (Bea Priestley, Natsuko Tora and Saki Kashima).

Cosmic Angels feuded with Donna Del Mondo at the beginning of 2021, and as a result, Shirakawa teamed up with Unagi Sayaka to unsuccessfully challenge Himeka and Maika for the Goddess of Stardom Championship at Stardom New Century 2021 In Shinjuku on March 14, 2021. At the Stardom 10th Anniversary from March 3, she competed in a 24-women Stardom All Star Rumble where she faced returning legends such as Chigusa Nagayo, Kyoko Inoue, Yuzuki Aikawa and Yoko Bito. At Stardom Yokohama Dream Cinderella 2021, Shirakawa fell short to Momo Watanabe in a singles match. On the first night of the Stardom Cinderella Tournament 2021 from April 10, she fell short to Utami Hayashishita in a Cinderella Tournament First-round match. At Yokohama Dream Cinderella 2021 in Summer on July 4, 2021, Shirakawa defeated stablemate Unagi Sayaka in the finals of a tournament for the vacant Future of Stardom Championship. At the Stardom 5 Star Grand Prix 2021 tournament, Shirakawa fought in the "Red Stars" Block and scored a total of six points after going against Momo Watanabe, Mayu Iwatani, Koguma, Starlight Kid, Himeka, Fukigen Death, Giulia and Saki Kashima. At Stardom 10th Anniversary Grand Final Osaka Dream Cinderella on October 9, 2021, Shirakawa teamed up with Mai Sakurai in a losing effort against Marvelous (Rin Kadokura and Maria). At the 2021 edition of the Goddesses of Stardom Tag League, Shirakawa teamed up with Tam Nakano as "Dream H" and fought in the "Blue Goddess Block" where they scored a total of three points after facing the teams of MOMOAZ (AZM and Momo Watanabe), Blue Marine (Mayu Iwatani and Rin Kadokura), Kurotora Kaidou (Starlight Kid and Ruaka), Ponytail and Samurai Road (Syuri and Maika) and C Moon (Lady C and Waka Tsukiyama). At Kawasaki Super Wars, the first event of the Stardom Super Wars trilogy which took place on November 3, 2021, Shirakawa defeated Saya Kamitani and Maika in a three-way match. At Tokyo Super Wars on November 27, she unsuccessfully challenged stablemate Tam Nakano for the Wonder of Stardom Championship, and at Osaka Super Wars, the last event of the trilogy which took place on December 18, Shirakawa teamed up with Unagi Sayaka and Tam Nakano in a losing effort against Mayu Iwatani, Hazuki and Koguma in a Six-woman tag team match as part of a ¥10 Million Unit tournament. At Stardom Dream Queendom on December 29, 2022, Shirakawa teamed up with Unagi Sayaka and Mai Sakurai to unsuccessfully challenge MaiHimePoi (Maika, Natsupoi and Himeka) for the Artist of Stardom Championship.

At Stardom Nagoya Supreme Fight on January 29, 2022, Shirakawa fought Thekla for the vacant SWA World Championship, coming out short. At Stardom Cinderella Journey on February 23, 2022, Shirakawa and Sayaka unsuccessfully challenged FWC (Hazuki and Koguma) for the Goddess of Stardom Championship. On the first night of the Stardom World Climax 2022 from March 26, she teamed up with Waka Tsukiyama and competed in a Six-woman tag team gauntlet match. On the second night from March 27, she participated in an 18-women Cinderella Rumble match won by Mei Suruga and also involving wrestlers from outside of Stardom such as Maria, Aoi, Haruka Umesaki and Yuna Mizumori. At Stardom Cinderella Tournament 2022, Shirakawa fell short to Mirai in the first rounds of April 3.

Championships and accomplishments
Best Body Japan Pro-Wrestling
BBW Women's Championship (1 time)
 Pro Wrestling Illustrated Ranked No. 123 of the top 150 female wrestlers in the PWI Women's 150'' in 2022
 World Wonder Ring Stardom
Artist of Stardom Championship (1 time) – with Tam Nakano and Unagi Sayaka
Future of Stardom Championship (1 time)

References 

1987 births
Living people
Japanese female professional wrestlers
21st-century professional wrestlers
Artist of Stardom Champions
Future of Stardom Champions